Wanquan Subdistrict is a subdistrict of Dadong District, in the east of Shenyang City, the capital of Liaoning province, China. , it has 7 residential communities under its administration.

References

Township-level divisions of Liaoning
Shenyang